The United States's Bedrock nuclear test series was a group of 27 nuclear tests conducted in 1974–1975. These tests  followed the Operation Arbor series and preceded the Operation Anvil series.

References

Explosions in 1974
Explosions in 1975
1974 in military history
1975 in military history
Bedrock